Joaquín Francisco Puig Ferrer, known as Ximo Puig (born 4 January 1959), is a Spanish politician who has served as leader of the Socialist Party of the Valencian Country (PSPV-PSOE), the Valencian regional branch of the PSOE, since March 2012. He is the current President of the Valencian Government, leading the second Puig government.

Life and career 
Puig was born in Morella, Castellón. A journalist by profession, he worked for local newspapers and for the Antena 3 radio station. He was elected to the Corts Valencianes, the Valencian regional parliament, in the first democratic elections in 1983. He resigned his seat in 1986, when he was appointed Director General of Institutional relations and information in the Valencian regional administration, serving until 1995.

In May 1995 he became mayor of his hometown of Morella, serving until 2012, when he resigned after becoming leader of the PSPV-PSOE. In the 2011 Spanish general election he was elected to the Congress of Deputies, representing Castellón Province. In Congress, he served as spokesman for the committee on industry, energy and tourism. In March 2014 Puig won the PSPV-PSOE primary to be the party's candidate for President of the Valencian Government in the 2015 regional elections. He received 68.8% of the votes in the primary.

On 25 June 2015, he was invested President of the Valencian Government with the favourable votes of PSPV-PSOE, Podemos and Compromís, succeeding Alberto Fabra and putting an end to two decades of PP governments in the region. He was re-elected for a second term, with the support of the same parties, on 13 June 2019.

References

 
|-

 

 

|-

1959 births
Living people
Presidents of the Valencian Government
Members of the 10th Congress of Deputies (Spain)
People from the Province of Castellón
Socialist Party of the Valencian Country politicians
Spanish journalists
Male journalists
Mayors of places in the Valencian Community
Members of the 1st Corts Valencianes
Members of the 5th Corts Valencianes
Members of the 6th Corts Valencianes
Members of the 7th Corts Valencianes
Members of the 9th Corts Valencianes
Members of the 10th Corts Valencianes